The Bangladesh Jatiotabadi Jubo Dal commonly known as the Jubo Dal, is the youth wing of the Bangladesh Nationalist Party (BNP).

History
Bangladesh Jatiotabadi Jubo Dal was established on 27 August 1978.

On 23 November 2003, Hassan Bahini, followers of Bangladesh Jatiotabadi Jubo Dal Jhalokati District unit President Mir Ziauddin Mizan, attacked the residence of Jubo League Shakherhat union unit President Saidur Rahman Khan Swapan injuring five of his family members.

Five members of Jubo Dal were injured in internal clashes in Barishal City in September 2008.

In March 2010, Syed Moazzem Hossain Alal was appointed President of Bangladesh Jatiotabadi Jubo Dal and Saiful Alam Nirob it's general secretary. Alal replaced Barkat Ullah Bulu, who had served as President of Bangladesh Jatiotabadi Jubo Dal since 2003.

Jubo Dal activist Saifuzzaman Sujan was killed on 2 December in a gunfight with Awami League activists. On 3 December 2013, a Jubo League activist was in Comilla District and another was killed in Bogura District. A Jessore Jubo Dal leader was killed on 17 December. On 20 December, Afzal Hossain, Vice President of Baharbunia Union unit of Jubo Dal, was murdered.

On 14 August 2015, Md Wasim, a leader of Chittagong City Jubo Dal, was killed allegedly by Awami League activists.

On 25 April, Jony Ali, a Dhaka Jubo Dal leader was beaten to death in Sakura Restaurant and Bar by staff members. A Bangladesh Jatiotabadi Jubo Dal leader, Md Harun, was shot dead after being shot at from a rally of Awami League in December 2017. Harun was the owner of ST Transport and had spoked against extortion by Chattra League, the student front of Awami League.

Mizanur Rahman, a leader of Comilla District unit of Jubo Dal was killed in Ibrahimpur neighborhood of the capital Dhaka on 15 October 2018.

Shajahan Ali, Secretary of Pabna District Jubo Dal, was found dead after going missing on 7 April in Atghoria Upazila. On 27 October 2021, President of Noakhali District unit of Jubo Dal, Manjurul Azim Sumon Prokash alias GS Sumon, was arrested from Rangamati District for being involved in attacks on minority Hindu community in Noakhali.

In February 2022, Bangladesh Jatiotabadi Jubo Dal and Jubo League clashes against each other in Ashulia, Savar over disputes regarding television cable business injuring 25. Jubo Dal leader Md Shajahan died in Chattogram Central Jail in March while waiting trial in six criminal cases. In May 2022, Sultan Salahuddin Tuku, the previous General Secretary and former President of Bangladesh Jatiotabadi Chatra Dal, was appointed president of Bangladesh Jatiotabadi Jubo Dal replacing Saiful Alam Nirob.

References

Bangladesh Nationalist Party
1978 establishments in Bangladesh
Nationalism in Asia
Youth wings of conservative parties